Hudson is a town in Salem and Steuben townships, Steuben County, in the U.S. state of Indiana. The population was 518 at the 2010 census.

History
An old variant name of the community was called North Benton. The Hudson post office has been in operation since 1875.

Geography
Hudson is located at  (41.532524, -85.081713).

Demographics

2010 census
As of the census of 2010, there were 518 people, 185 households, and 136 families living in the town. The racial makeup of the town was 98.1% White, 0.2% Native American, 0.6% Asian, 0.2% Pacific Islander, 0.6% from other races, and 0.4% from two or more races. Hispanic or Latino of any race were 1.9% of the population.

There were 185 households, of which 42.2% had children under the age of 18 living with them, 51.9% were married couples living together, 11.9% had a female householder with no husband present, 9.7% had a male householder with no wife present, and 26.5% were non-families. 21.6% of all households were made up of individuals, and 6.4% had someone living alone who was 65 years of age or older. The average household size was 2.80 and the average family size was 3.14.

The median age in the town was 34.5 years. 31.3% of residents were under the age of 18; 5.7% were between the ages of 18 and 24; 27.6% were from 25 to 44; 25.5% were from 45 to 64; and 10% were 65 years of age or older. The gender makeup of the town was 50.6% male and 49.4% female.

2000 census
As of the census of 2000, there were 596 people, 212 households, and 154 families living in the town. The racial makeup of the town was 97.32% White, 1.17% Native American, 0.17% Asian, 1.01% from other races, and 0.34% from two or more races. Hispanic or Latino of any race were 1.17% of the population.

There were 212 households, out of which 40.1% had children under the age of 18 living with them, 61.3% were married couples living together, 6.1% had a female householder with no husband present, and 26.9% were non-families. 21.7% of all households were made up of individuals, and 3.8% had someone living alone who was 65 years of age or older. The average household size was 2.81 and the average family size was 3.27.

In the town, the population was spread out, with 32.4% under the age of 18, 7.9% from 18 to 24, 34.4% from 25 to 44, 18.1% from 45 to 64, and 7.2% who were 65 years of age or older. The median age was 30 years. For every 100 females, there were 104.8 males. For every 100 females age 18 and over, there were 104.6 males.

The median income for a household in the town was $42,321, and the median income for a family was $44,792. Males had a median income of $30,000 versus $24,954 for females. The per capita income for the town was $17,282. About 3.2% of families and 4.3% of the population were below the poverty line, including 2.4% of those under age 18 and none of those age 65 or over.

References

External links
 Town of Hudson, Indiana website
 Hudson, Indiana - People, News and Information

Towns in Steuben County, Indiana
Towns in Indiana